Coleophora liriophorella is a moth of the family Coleophoridae. It is found in Morocco.

The larvae feed on Cytisus linifolius. They feed on the leaves of their host plant.

References

liriophorella
Moths described in 1982
Moths of Africa